Bleekemolen is a Dutch surname. Notable people with the surname include:

Jeroen Bleekemolen (born 1981), Dutch racing driver
Michael Bleekemolen (born 1949), Dutch racing driver
Sebastiaan Bleekemolen (born 1978), Dutch racing driver
 

Dutch-language surnames